Edward Coyne may refer to:

 Edward Coyne (rugby league), Australian  rugby league player 
 Edward Coyne (priest) (1896–1958), Jesuit priest, economist and sociologist